Lester Ordway is an American politician and college instructor at Central Maine Community College. He serves as a Republican member for the 23rd district of the Maine House of Representatives.

Ordway is a resident of Standish, Maine and attended the University of Southern Maine. In 2015, he was elected for the 23rd district of the Maine House of Representatives. Ordway succeeded Michael Shaw. He assumed his office on December 7, 2015.

References 

Year of birth missing (living people)
Living people
Republican Party members of the Maine House of Representatives
21st-century American politicians
University of Southern Maine alumni
Central Maine Community College faculty
People from Standish, Maine